Caterina Fake is an American entrepreneur and businesswoman. She co-founded the websites Flickr in 2004 and Hunch in 2007. Fake has been a trustee for nonprofit organizations and was the chairwoman of Etsy. For her role in creating Flickr, Fake was listed in Time magazine's Time 100, and she has been recognized within Silicon Valley for her work as an angel investor.

Early life and education 
Fake was raised in northern New Jersey by her American father and her Filipina mother. As a child, she was not allowed to watch television, and her hobbies included reading poetry and playing classical music.

She graduated from the prestigious Choate Rosemary Hall in 1986 and Vassar College in 1991 with a degree in English, after transferring from Smith College in 1989. Vassar College had an intranet that the students could connect to from their dorm rooms, which Fake credits as being largely responsible for her eventually finding web design. After working various jobs, including as a painter's assistant, an investment banker, and at a dive shop (which Fake called her "post-college what-do-I-want-to-do period"), she was delayed in San Francisco while visiting her sister. Fake taught herself about the Internet and began creating websites and CD-ROMs.

Career 
In 1997, she took a job managing the community forums of Netscape. This experience, along with others in blogging and online communities, led her to co-found Ludicorp in Vancouver with Stewart Butterfield and Jason Classon in summer 2002. The company developed a massively multiplayer online role-playing game called Game Neverending. The game did not launch, but Fake and Butterfield started a new product called Flickr in 2004 that became one of the world's most popular photosharing websites. Flickr was acquired by Yahoo! in 2005 for around US$30 million. It became part of the "Web 2.0" sites, integrating features such as social networking, community open APIs, tagging, and algorithms that surfaced the most popular content. After the acquisition, Fake took a job at Yahoo, where she ran the Technology Development group, known for its Hack Yahoo program and for Brickhouse, a rapid development environment for new products. She resigned from Yahoo on June 13, 2008.

Fake previously worked as the art director for Salon, a news and opinion website started in 1995. In 2007, she co-founded the website Hunch with entrepreneur Chris Dixon, which was acquired by eBay for $80 million in November 2011. As of 2014, Fake's most recent project is called Findery. It launched under limited beta in February 2012 and was originally called Pinwheel. It was renamed to Findery in July 2012. The company is headquartered in San Francisco.

Fake joined the board of directors of Creative Commons in August 2008, and the Sundance Institute board of trustees in 2015. In 2014, she left Etsy's board of directors after eight years, citing other professional and personal priorities. She was chairwoman at the time of her resignation.

Fake has won various awards, including Bloomberg Businessweek's "Best Leaders" in 2005, Forbes's 2005 eGang, Fast Company's Fast 50, and Red Herring's 20 Entrepreneurs under 35. She was listed on the 2006 Time 100—Time magazine's list of the world's 100 most influential people—under the category "Builders and Titans" with her Flickr co-founder. She received honorary doctorates from the Rhode Island School of Design in 2009 and from The New School in 2013. Fake was a recipient of the 2018 "Visionary Award" from the Silicon Valley Forum, which recognizes leaders in Silicon Valley businesses. Among her most recognized businesses, she was identified for her contributions to Silicon Valley as an author and angel investor.

Fake hosted the podcast "Should This Exist?" produced by Quartz.

Personal life 
Fake was married to Stewart Butterfield, her Flickr co-founder, from 2001 to 2007. They had one daughter together, in 2007. As of 2015, Fake is in a relationship with Jaiku co-founder Jyri Engeström, and the couple have three children between them.

Notes

References

External links 

 
 

1969 births
20th-century American businesspeople
20th-century American businesswomen
21st-century American businesspeople
21st-century American businesswomen
American people of Filipino descent
American corporate directors
American technology chief executives
American technology company founders
American women chief executives
Businesspeople from California
Businesspeople from New York City
Businesspeople from Pittsburgh
Businesspeople in information technology
Canadian technology company founders
Choate Rosemary Hall alumni
Living people
Members of the Creative Commons board of directors
Smith College alumni
Vassar College alumni
American women company founders
American company founders